Red red is a Ghanaian dish composed of black-eyed peas, cooked in palm oil or other vegetable oil with plantain. The dish derives its name from the red color it takes on from the red palm oil (zomi) and the fried plantain. Red red typically consists of fish such as tinned mackerel or pilchards, black-eyed peas, Scotch bonnet peppers, onions, oil and tomatoes. It is commonly known in Ghana as "kokoo ne beans. Though often served with fish, red red can also be vegetarian. It can be served with fried plantain, avocado, and rice or garri for a complete meal.

See also 
 Ghanaian cuisine

References

External links 
 Video:The perfect red red recipe

Ghanaian cuisine
Legume dishes
Plantain dishes